Playa (plural playas) may refer to:

Landforms
 Endorheic basin, also known as a sink, alkali flat or sabkha, a desert basin with no outlet which periodically fills with water to form a temporary lake
 Dry lake, often called a playa in the southwestern United States

Populated places

United States

 Playas, New Mexico, an unincorporated community in New Mexico
 Playa, Añasco, Puerto Rico, a barrio in the municipality of Añasco, Puerto Rico
 Playa, Guayanilla, Puerto Rico, a barrio in the municipality of Guayanilla, Puerto Rico
 Playa, Ponce, Puerto Rico, a barrio of Ponce, Puerto Rico
 Playa, Santa Isabel, Puerto Rico, a barrio in the municipality of Santa Isabel, Puerto Rico
 Playa, Yabucoa, Puerto Rico, a barrio in the municipality of Yabucoa, Puerto Rico

Cuba
 Playa, Havana, one of the 15 municipalities of the City of Havana, Cuba

Ecuador
 Playas Canton, Ecuador
 Playas, Ecuador, the administrative center of the Playas Canton

Other
 The Playa, Black Rock Desert, Nevada, United States
 Playa (band), an American R&B trio

See also
 La Playa (disambiguation)
 Playa Azul (disambiguation)
 Playa Grande (disambiguation)